Fear and Desire is a 1952 American anti-war film directed, produced, and edited by Stanley Kubrick, and written by Howard Sackler. With a production team of only fifteen people, the film was Kubrick's feature directorial debut. Though the film is not about any specific war, it was produced and released during the height of the Korean War.

Plot

Fear and Desire opens with an off-screen narration by actor David Allen who tells the audience:
There is a war in this forest. Not a war that has been fought, nor one that will be, but any war. And the enemies who struggle here do not exist unless we call them into being. This forest then, and all that happens now is outside history. Only the unchanging shapes of fear and doubt and death are from our world. These soldiers that you see keep our language and our time, but have no other country but the mind.

The story is set during a war between two unidentified countries. An airplane carrying four soldiers from one country has crashed six miles behind enemy lines. The soldiers come upon a river and build a raft, hoping they can use the waterway to reach their battalion. As they are building their raft, they are approached by a young peasant girl who does not speak their language. The soldiers apprehend the girl and bind her to a tree with their belts. The youngest of them, Sidney, is left behind to guard the girl. He starts to talk to her, but as she doesn't understand him, he descends into a state of delirium. When he unbelts her, believing she will embrace him, she tries to escape and Sidney shoots her dead. Mac, another of the four soldiers, finds the dead girl and watches as Sidney runs off towards the river. Mac persuades the commander, Lt. Corby, and his friend Fletcher to let him take the raft for a solo voyage, in connection with a plan to kill an enemy general at a nearby base. Mac distracts the general's guards by shooting at them while on the raft and is wounded. While this is happening, Fletcher and Corby successfully infiltrate the base, and the enemy general is killed. After killing the general, they use an enemy plane to escape to their home base. After landing, they talk and eat with their own general, and return to the river to await Mac. Sitting there, they philosophize about war and how no man is made for it, before finding the raft floating downriver, with a dying Mac and a delirious Sidney.

Cast
 David Allen as Narrator
 Frank Silvera as Sgt. Mac
 Kenneth Harp as Lt. Corby / The General
 Paul Mazursky as Pvt. Sidney
 Steve Coit as Pvt. Fletcher / The Captain
 Virginia Leith as The Girl

Production
Prior to shooting Fear and Desire, Kubrick was a Look photographer who had directed two short documentaries in 1951, Day of the Fight and Flying Padre. Both films were acquired for theatrical release by RKO Radio Pictures. From his experiences in creating short films, Kubrick felt he was ready to make a narrative feature film. Kubrick quit his full-time job with Look and set forth to create Fear and Desire.
 
The screenplay was written by Howard Sackler, a classmate of Kubrick's at William Howard Taft High School in the Bronx, New York; Sackler later won the Pulitzer Prize for his 1968 drama The Great White Hope. Virginia Leith, who played The Girl in this film, would go on to play Jan in the 1962 cult classic The Brain That Wouldn't Die. Paul Mazursky, who would later receive recognition as the director of such films as Harry and Tonto and An Unmarried Woman, was cast as the soldier who kills the captive peasant.

Funds for Fear and Desire were raised from Kubrick's family and friends, with most of it coming from Martin Perveler, Kubrick's uncle and the owner of a profitable pharmacy. The film's original budget has been estimated at $10,000.

The production team consisted of 15 people: the director, five actors (Paul Mazursky, Frank Silvera, Kenneth Harp, Steve Coit, and Virginia Leith), five crew members (including Kubrick's first wife, Toba Metz) and three Mexican laborers who transported the film equipment around California's San Gabriel Mountains, where the film was shot. Due to budget limitations, Kubrick improvised in the use of his equipment. To create fog, Kubrick used a crop sprayer, but the cast and crew was nearly asphyxiated because the machinery still contained the insecticide used for its agricultural work. For tracking shots, Paul Mazursky recalled how Kubrick came up with a novel substitute: "There was no dolly track, just a baby carriage to move the camera", he told an interviewer.

To reduce production costs, Kubrick had intended to make it a silent picture, but in the end the adding of sounds, effects and music brought the production over budget to around $53,000, and had to be bailed out by producer Richard de Rochemont, on condition that he help in de Rochemont's production of a five-part program about Abraham Lincoln for the educational TV series Omnibus, filmed on location in Hodgenville, Kentucky. Kubrick also ran into difficulty in editing a key scene where one of the soldiers throws a plate of beans to the floor and enters the frame from the wrong side. Kubrick's blocking of the crucial scene was faulty, and his actors accidentally crossed the so-called "stage line"; this required the negative to be flipped in the printing process to preserve continuity, which was another expense.

Release
The film was first shown at the Venice Film Festival in August 1952 under the title Shape of Fear. It was later picked up for U.S. theatrical release by Joseph Burstyn, a distributor and war veteran who specialized in the presentation of European art house titles. The film was renamed Fear and Desire and was distributed with the tagline "Trapped ... 4 Desperate Men and a Strange Half-Animal Girl!" In an uncredited review following the New York premiere, The New York Times noted: "If Fear and Desire is uneven and sometimes reveals an experimental rather than a polished exterior, its overall effect is entirely worthy of the sincere effort put into it."

Critical response
Kubrick received praise for Fear and Desire from film critic and screenwriter James Agee, who reportedly took Kubrick out for a drink and told him, "There are too many good things ... to call [Fear and Desire] arty." Columbia University professor Mark Van Doren sent Kubrick a letter that stated: "The incident of the girl bound to the tree will make movie history once it is seen ... Stanley Kubrick is worth watching for those who want to discover high talent at the moment it appears."

Fear and Desire was not a box office success, and Kubrick had to take a for-hire job directing the promotional short The Seafarers on behalf of the Seafarers International Union in order to raise funds for his next planned feature, Killer's Kiss (1955), which would be co-written by Kubrick and Howard Sackler and star Frank Silvera, one of the Fear and Desire actors.

Disappearance and rediscovery
In the years following its release, Fear and Desire seemed to have disappeared. Distributor Joseph Burstyn died in November 1953 on a trans-Atlantic flight, and his company went out of business. Legend has it that Kubrick destroyed the film's original negative and sought to do the same to any leftover prints after the failed film fell out of circulation following Burstyn's death. However, some prints of the film remained in private collections.

Fear and Desire had its first retrospective screening at the 1993 Telluride Film Festival. In January 1994, the Film Forum, a nonprofit art and revival theater in lower Manhattan, announced plans to show Fear and Desire on a double bill with Killer's Kiss. Although the film's copyright lapsed and the property was in the public domain, thus allowing it to be shown without fear of legal actions, Kubrick tried to discourage it from gaining an audience. Through Warner Brothers, Kubrick issued a statement that severely downplayed the film's value, and he called Fear and Desire "a bumbling amateur film exercise".

There have been very few public screenings of Fear and Desire; the only commercially available print belongs to the George Eastman House in Rochester, New York. Among the rare presentations were a 1993 screening at the Library of Congress in Washington, D.C., a 2003 one-time screening at the Two Boots Den of Cin in New York City and an August 2008 presentation at the Wexner Center for the Arts in Columbus, Ohio. Also, some clips from the film can be seen in the 2001 documentary Stanley Kubrick: A Life in Pictures.

In 2010, an original copy of the film was discovered at a Puerto Rican film laboratory.

On December 14, 2011, Turner Classic Movies aired a print restored by George Eastman House.

Kino Video released a DVD and Blu-ray on October 23, 2012, and was released the following year by British company Eureka Entertainment as part of its Masters of Cinema line.

References

Further reading

External links

 
 
 
 

1953 films
1953 drama films
1950s war adventure films
American action adventure films
American war adventure films
1950s English-language films
Films directed by Stanley Kubrick
American black-and-white films
Films shot in California
Films produced by Stanley Kubrick
Anti-war films
Articles containing video clips
Films scored by Gerald Fried
1950s political films
1953 directorial debut films
1950s rediscovered films
Rediscovered American films
1950s American films